Jaganlu may refer to:
 Jaganlu, Hamadan
 Jaganlu, West Azerbaijan
 Jaganlu-ye Kord, West Azerbaijan Province